Syed Ali Ahmed Shah was an Azad Kashmiri politician who served as President of Azad Kashmir from 30 May 1950 to 2 December 1951.

References

Presidents of Azad Kashmir